The 2015–16 William & Mary Tribe women's basketball team represents The College of William & Mary during the 2015–16 NCAA Division I women's basketball season. The Tribe, led by third year head coach Ed Swanson, play their home games at Kaplan Arena and are members of the Colonial Athletic Association. They finished the season 15–15, 6–12 CAA play to finish in seventh place. They lost in the first round of the CAA women's tournament to Towson.

Roster

Schedule

|-
!colspan=9 style="background:#115740; color:#B9975B;"| Non-conference regular season

|-
!colspan=9 style="background:#115740; color:#B9975B;"| CAA regular season

|-
!colspan=9 style="background:#115740; color:#B9975B;"|CAA Women's Tournament

See also
2015–16 William & Mary Tribe men's basketball team

References

William & Mary Tribe women's basketball seasons
William And Mary
William
William